The 2006 NBA playoffs was the postseason tournament of the National Basketball Association's 2005–06 season. The tournament concluded with the Eastern Conference champion Miami Heat defeating the Western Conference champion Dallas Mavericks 4 games to 2 in the NBA Finals. Dwyane Wade was named NBA Finals MVP.

Overview
This season was the last time that the Sacramento Kings made the playoffs. The Kings hold the longest playoff drought in NBA playoff history at 16 years, as of 2023. The MLB’s Seattle Mariners qualified for the playoffs in 2022. The

Kings now hold the title for the longest active playoff drought among the four major North American sports leagues. 

The Los Angeles Clippers made the playoffs for the first time since 1997, and advanced to the second round for the first time since 1976, when they were the Buffalo Braves. They came within one game of making the conference finals for the first time, but lost Game 7 to the Suns. Until 2020, this was the closest the Clippers came to making the Conference Finals.

The Phoenix Suns became the eighth team to win a playoff series despite trailing 3-1 with their first round victory over the Los Angeles Lakers. The Suns lost to the Dallas Mavericks in the Western Conference Finals.

The Denver Nuggets also appeared in the playoffs as the 3rd seed in the Western Conference despite a 44-38 record (due to winning their division). However, they lost to the Los Angeles Clippers in the first round, and forced the NBA to change how division winners are seeded starting the following season.

2006 was the playoff debut of LeBron James, who helped the Cleveland Cavaliers eke out 1-point OT victories over the Washington Wizards in Games 5 and 6 of their first-round series to advance. It was the Cavaliers first playoff appearance since 1998, and they earned their first playoff series win since 1993. The Cavaliers played against the two-time defending Eastern Conference champion Detroit Pistons in the next round. The Cavs were routed in Game 1. The Cavs lost Game 2 by 6. The Cavs won the next three

matches in a row, and they were 1 game away from beating the Pistons. Detroit recovered and won the last 2, in order to take the series in 7. The Pistons and Cavaliers met in the next year’s Playoffs, and the Cavaliers won that series in six games. This was the last time that the Pistons beat the Cavaliers in a playoff series, as of 2023.

This season also marked the first time that two 60-win teams met before the Conference Finals, due to the seeding format. The San Antonio Spurs and the Dallas Mavericks played against each other in the Western Conference semifinals. The Mavericks won the series in seven games, marking the first time the Mavericks beat the Spurs in a playoff series.

This year’s NBA Finals also featured a number of firsts

- Both NBA Finalists made their first NBA Finals: The Dallas Mavericks and the Miami Heat, for the first time since 1971.

- Neither the Lakers nor the Spurs represented the Western Conference, for the first time since 1998.

- For the first time since 1998, the NBA Finals did not feature Tim Duncan or Kobe Bryant (although Kobe’s ex-teammate, Shaquille O’Neal, returned to the Finals for the fifth time in seven seasons)

- For the first time since 2001, neither the Nets or the Pistons represented the Eastern Conference (these two teams were eliminated by the Miami Heat en route to their first Finals appearance)

- The Mavericks became the first team since 1977 to lose the NBA Finals despite leading 2-0. They also became the first team in NBA History to win the first two games, build a double digit lead in game 3, lose game 3, and the rest of the series.

- The Miami Heat won their first NBA Championship despite losing the first two games, the third team in NBA History to do so.

The 2006 NBA Playoffs also featured several lasts.

- Game 6 of the Spurs-Kings series was the last NBA Playoff game to be played at ARCO Arena.

- The last time a division winner was granted a top three seed in the NBA Playoffs.

- The Indiana Pacers’ last playoff appearance until 2011.

- The last time the Chicago Bulls lost a first-round series following their 1998 championship.

- The last time the Los Angeles Clippers won a playoff series until 2012 (and earned home court advantage until 2013).

Format

With the addition of the 30th NBA franchise, the Charlotte Bobcats, in 2005, the NBA realigned its divisions. Each conference had three divisions of five teams each, and at this point in time, the winner of each division was guaranteed a top-three playoff seed regardless of whether the team had one of the top-eight records in its conference. However, the division champion was not guaranteed home-court advantage; a division-leading team could be seeded second or third but face a lower seed (that did not win its division) with a better record, and the lower seed would have home-court advantage.

This was illustrated in the first round here when the 44-win Denver Nuggets won the Northwest Division and had the third seed, yet did not have home-court advantage against the sixth-seeded, 47-win Los Angeles Clippers. The Clippers had played the Memphis Grizzlies a week before the playoffs to determine the fifth and sixth seed. The loser of the game would face Denver, whereas the winner would face fourth-seeded Dallas, who had the second-best record in the conference. It was speculated that the Clippers lost on purpose to play Denver in the first round. Starting in the 2007 playoffs, being a division winner did not guarantee a top-3 playoff seed.

Playoff qualifying

Eastern Conference

Best record in NBA

The Detroit Pistons clinched the best record in the NBA, earning home-court advantage throughout the playoffs. However, when the Pistons lost to the Miami Heat in the Eastern Conference Finals, home-court advantage in the NBA Finals went to the Western Conference champion Dallas Mavericks, which had a better record than the Heat.

Clinched a playoff berth
The following teams clinched a playoff berth in the East:

 Detroit Pistons (64-18) (clinched Central division)
 Miami Heat (52-30) (clinched Southeast division)
 New Jersey Nets (49-33) (clinched Atlantic division)
 Cleveland Cavaliers (50-32) 
 Washington Wizards (42-40)
 Indiana Pacers (41-41)
 Chicago Bulls (41-41)
 Milwaukee Bucks (40-42)

Western Conference

Best record in conference
The San Antonio Spurs clinched the best record in the Western Conference, and had home-court advantage throughout the Western Conference playoffs. However, when they lost to the Dallas Mavericks in the Conference Semifinals, Dallas had home court advantage in the Western Conference Finals.

Clinched a playoff berth
The following teams clinched a playoff berth in the West:

 San Antonio Spurs (63-19) (clinched Southwest division)
 Phoenix Suns (54-28) (clinched Pacific division)
 Denver Nuggets (44-38) (clinched Northwest division)
 Dallas Mavericks (60-22)
 Memphis Grizzlies (49-33)
 Los Angeles Clippers (47-35)
 Los Angeles Lakers (45-37)
 Sacramento Kings (44-38)

Bracket
Teams that advanced to the next round are boldfaced; those with home court advantage are in italics.

TV coverage
First and second-round games were televised on ABC, TNT, ESPN, ESPN2 and NBA TV in the United States and on TSN, Rogers Sportsnet, The Score, and Raptors NBA TV in Canada; some games were also televised on local or regional TV networks. The Eastern Conference finals aired exclusively on ESPN and ABC, and the Western Conference finals aired exclusively on TNT; TSN and The Score split coverage of the Conference Finals. The NBA Finals aired exclusively on ABC in the U.S. and on TSN in Canada.

First round
All times are in Eastern Daylight Time (UTC−4)

Eastern Conference first round

(1) Detroit Pistons vs. (8) Milwaukee Bucks

This was the fourth playoff meeting between these two teams, with the Pistons winning the first three meetings.

(2) Miami Heat vs. (7) Chicago Bulls

This was the fourth playoff meeting between these two teams, with the Bulls winning the first three meetings.

(3) New Jersey Nets vs. (6) Indiana Pacers

This was the second playoff meeting between these two teams, with the Nets winning the first meeting.

(4) Cleveland Cavaliers vs. (5) Washington Wizards

 In Game 3, LeBron James hits the game-winner over Michael Ruffin with 5.7 seconds left, and in Game 5, he hits another game-winner from the baseline with .9 seconds left. 
 In Game 6, Gilbert Arenas forces overtime with a three from 32 feet with 2.3 seconds left, and in OT, Damon Jones hits the series-winning shot with 4.8 seconds left.

This was the third playoff meeting between these two teams, with each team winning one series apiece.

Western Conference first round

(1) San Antonio Spurs vs. (8) Sacramento Kings

In Game 2, Brent Barry hit a wild 3 with 4 seconds left to force OT.
In Game 3, Kevin Martin hit the game-winning lay-up at the buzzer.
Game 4 is, to date, the last playoff win for the Kings.
Game 6 was the final playoff game played at the Arco Arena.

This was the first playoff meeting between the Kings and the Spurs.

(2) Phoenix Suns vs. (7) Los Angeles Lakers

In Game 4, Kobe Bryant hit both a lay-up with 0.7 seconds left to force OT, and the game-winning jump shot at the buzzer in overtime.
In Game 6, Tim Thomas hit a 3-pointer with 6.3 seconds left to force OT.
The Suns became the 8th team in NBA history to overcome a 3–1 series deficit.
This was the first playoff series a Phil Jackson coached team lost after taking a series lead, prior to this his record was 44-0.

This was the tenth playoff meeting between these two teams, with the Lakers winning seven of the first nine meetings.

(3) Denver Nuggets vs. (6) Los Angeles Clippers

This was the first playoff meeting between the Nuggets and the Clippers.

(4) Dallas Mavericks vs. (5) Memphis Grizzlies

In Game 3, Dirk Nowitzki hit the game-tying 3 with 15.7 seconds left to force OT.

This was the first playoff meeting between the Mavericks and the Grizzlies.

Conference semifinals

Eastern Conference semifinals

(1) Detroit Pistons vs. (4) Cleveland Cavaliers

2006 marked the first time the Cavaliers had made the playoffs since 1998 with Shawn Kemp, and the first time that major professional teams from Michigan and Ohio met in a postseason series or game since 1957.  They came off a playoff series win vs the Wizards, while the Pistons came in off a 4-1 win vs the 8th seeded Bucks. Detroit was expected to win the series, and took a commanding two games to none lead with two wins at the Palace of Auburn Hills. James and the Cavaliers weren't intimidated however, and won their two home games to tie the series at 2. Coming into Game 5, both teams were confident, but the Pistons were expected to pull out the win easily. The game was low scoring throughout as usual in this series, with Cleveland holding a 68-66 lead through 3 quarters. With the game tied at 84 with 26 seconds left in regulation, Drew Gooden came through and hit a layup to give Cleveland the lead that they never squandered. James led the Cavs with 32 and this brought the series to Cleveland up 3–2, quite shockingly. In the final minute of Game 6, Richard Hamilton grabbed two offensive rebounds and passed the ball to Rasheed Wallace, who was fouled. Detroit held on to win Game 6 by 2, and won Game 7 at home to advance.

This was the first playoff meeting between the Cavaliers and the Pistons.

(2) Miami Heat vs. (3) New Jersey Nets

This was the second playoff meeting between these two teams, with the Heat winning the first meeting.

Western Conference semifinals
This was the first time both conference semifinals went seven games since 1994.

(1) San Antonio Spurs vs. (4) Dallas Mavericks

The Mavericks almost blew a 3-1 series lead to the defending champion San Antonio Spurs, but managed to pull out a Game 7 overtime win in San Antonio to close out the series and become the 5th NBA road team to win Game 7 after leading series 3–1. This was also the second time in NBA history that the road team won a Game 7 in overtime; the Los Angeles Lakers defeated the Sacramento Kings in the same manner in the 2002 Western Conference Finals. This was the last time when the Game 7 as of Overtime thriller until 2021 was Bucks vs. Nets.

This was the third playoff meeting between these two teams, with the Spurs winning the first two meetings.

(2) Phoenix Suns vs. (6) Los Angeles Clippers

In Game 4, Sam Cassell hit two three-pointers down the stretch, including one with 27 seconds left, after the Suns had rallied from 13 down to within one with under a minute to play. 
In Game 5, Raja Bell tied the game at 111 on a three-pointer from the corner with 1.1 seconds left to force the second overtime, this after telling his teammates during a timeout he would make it. The Suns, who blew a 19-point third quarter lead, never trailed in the second extra session.

This was the first playoff meeting between the Clippers and the Suns.

Conference finals

Eastern Conference finals

(1) Detroit Pistons vs. (2) Miami Heat

This was the third playoff meeting between these two teams, with each team winning one series apiece.

Western Conference finals

(2) Phoenix Suns vs. (4) Dallas Mavericks

This was the second playoff meeting between these two teams, with the Suns winning the first meeting.

NBA Finals: (W4) Dallas Mavericks vs. (E2) Miami Heat
All times are in Eastern Daylight Time (UTC−4)

This was the first playoff meeting between the Mavericks and the Heat.

This NBA Finals featured two teams that never made it to the finals before. The last time this happened was in 1971, when the Milwaukee Bucks met the Baltimore Bullets.

Statistic leaders

References

External links
 Official website of the 2006 NBA Playoffs
 ESPN's NBA page

National Basketball Association playoffs
Playoffs

fi:NBA-kausi 2005–2006#Pudotuspelit